Komensky is an unincorporated community in Hutchinson Township, McLeod County, Minnesota, United States, near Hutchinson.  The community is located along McLeod County Road 79 (200th Street) near McLeod County Road 4 (Major Avenue).  Bear Creek flows through the community.

References

Unincorporated communities in McLeod County, Minnesota
Unincorporated communities in Minnesota